Julio Cortes is an American politician serving as a member of the Washington House of Representatives for the 38th district. Elected in November 2022, he assumed office on January 9, 2023.

Education 
Cortes earned a Bachelor of Arts degree in public relations and journalism from Western Washington University in 2009.

Career 
From 2010 to 2018, Cortes worked as an outreach and public relations manager at Cocoon House, a non-profit organization. From 2018 to 2021, he served as a communications officer for the city of Everett, Washington. Cortes was elected to the Washington House of Representatives in November 2022.

References 

Living people
Washington (state) Democrats
Members of the Washington House of Representatives
People from Everett, Washington
Politicians from Everett, Washington
People from Snohomish County, Washington
Western Washington University alumni
Year of birth missing (living people)